Luciano Galbo (12 April 1943 – 23 September 2011) was an Italian racing cyclist. He won stage 3 of the 1965 Giro d'Italia.

References

External links
 

1943 births
2011 deaths
Italian male cyclists
Italian Giro d'Italia stage winners
Place of birth missing
Sportspeople from Padua
Cyclists from the Province of Padua